Rostěnice-Zvonovice is a municipality in Vyškov District in the South Moravian Region of the Czech Republic. It has about 500 inhabitants.

Administrative parts
The municipality is made up of villages of Rostěnice and Zvonovice.

History
The first written mention about Rostěnice is from 1141 and about Zvonovice is from 1355. Rostěnice and Zvonovice were merged into one municipality in 1960.

Until 1945, Kučerov belonged to the German-speaking enclave called Vyškov Language Island. The area was colonized by German settlers in the second half of the 13th century. The coexistence of Czechs and Germans was mostly peaceful, which changed only after 1935, when many Germans tended to Nazism. In 1945–1946, the German population was expelled and the municipality was resettled by Czech families.

References

Villages in Vyškov District